Dionysius Hayom Rumbaka (born 22 October 1988) is a retired Indonesian badminton player. He is a men's singles specialist from PB. Djarum, a badminton club in Kudus, Central Java and has joined the club since 2005. He retired in 2018 due to long injury and started his coaching career in PB. Djarum youth team.

Achievements

Southeast Asian Games 

Men's singles

BWF Grand Prix (4 titles, 5 runners-up) 
The BWF Grand Prix had two levels, the BWF Grand Prix and Grand Prix Gold. It was a series of badminton tournaments sanctioned by the Badminton World Federation (BWF) which was held from 2007 to 2017.

Men's singles

  Grand Prix Gold tournament
  Grand Prix tournament

BWF International Challenge/Series (2 titles, 2 runners-up) 

Men's singles

  BWF International Challenge tournament
  BWF International Series tournament
  BWF Future Series tournament

Performance timeline

National team 
 Senior level

Individual competitions 
 Senior level

Record against selected opponents 
Head to head (H2H) against Superseries finalists, Worlds Semi-finalists, and Olympic quarterfinalists.

  Bao Chunlai 0–2
  Chen Jin 0–4
  Chen Long 0–4
  Chen Yu 0–1
  Du Pengyu 3–0
  Lin Dan 0–1
  Tian Houwei 0–1
  Wang Zhengming 1–2
  Xue Song 1–0
  Hans-Kristian Vittinghus 1–3
  Jan Ø. Jørgensen 0–7
  Peter Gade 0–1
  Viktor Axelsen 1–0
  Marc Zwiebler 0–3
  Hu Yun 1–3
  Simon Santoso 1–3
  Sony Dwi Kuncoro 1–1
  Taufik Hidayat 0–2
  Tommy Sugiarto 4–1
  Ajay Jayaram '''2–3
  H. S. Prannoy 1–0
  Parupalli Kashyap 2–2
  Sho Sasaki 2–3
  Takuma Ueda 2–2
  Lee Dong-keun 1–0
  Lee Hyun-il 0–1
  Son Wan-ho 1–4
  Lee Chong Wei 0–6
  Liew Daren 3–2
  Muhammad Hafiz Hashim 1–2
  Boonsak Ponsana 1–3
  Tanongsak Saensomboonsuk 1–0
  Chou Tien-chen 1–1
  Nguyễn Tiến Minh 2–2

References 

1988 births
Living people
Sportspeople from Special Region of Yogyakarta
Indonesian male badminton players
Badminton players at the 2010 Asian Games
Asian Games bronze medalists for Indonesia
Asian Games medalists in badminton
Medalists at the 2010 Asian Games
Competitors at the 2011 Southeast Asian Games
Competitors at the 2013 Southeast Asian Games
Southeast Asian Games gold medalists for Indonesia
Southeast Asian Games silver medalists for Indonesia
Southeast Asian Games medalists in badminton
Indonesian Christians
21st-century Indonesian people
20th-century Indonesian people